Power FM (also known as Power 98.7 FM) is a South African commercial radio station based in Gauteng.

It was awarded an FM radio frequency commercial license from ICASA on 15 December 2011 and went on-air on the 18 June 2013.

The radio station is owned by MSG Afrika Investment Holdings, led by Given Mkhari, with shareholders including Ndalo Media, led by Khanyi Dhlomo; Zico, led by Sandile Zungu; and various other investors.

Broadcast languages
English

Broadcast time
24/7

Coverage area
National

Target audience
Age Group 15 - 49
LSM 6 - 10

Programme format
70% Talk
30% Music
During weekdays, it broadcasts talk content from 05am to 00am and music will broadcast from midnight till 05am.
During weekends, it broadcasts music around the clock, with talk elements at various intervals.

Location
The station is based in:
POWER HOUSE, 79 Central Street, Houghton Estate, Gauteng

References

External links
Power FM Website
SAARF Website
Sentech Website

2011 establishments in South Africa
Mass media in Gauteng
Radio stations established in 2011
Radio stations in South Africa